Li Wenjuan (born 6 February 1994) is a Chinese former professional racing cyclist. She competed at the 2014 Asian Games and won the silver medal in the time trial, and finished fourth in the time trial at the 2015 Asian Cycling Championships.

See also
 List of 2015 UCI Women's Teams and riders

References

External links

1994 births
Living people
Chinese female cyclists
Place of birth missing (living people)
Asian Games medalists in cycling
Cyclists at the 2014 Asian Games
Medalists at the 2014 Asian Games
Asian Games silver medalists for China
21st-century Chinese women